Airport Road is a metro station on Line 1 of the Mumbai Metro in Andheri, Mumbai. It was opened to the public on 8 June 2014.

Upon the metro line being commissioned for passengers, the BEST launched a special bus service Metro Pheri 1 which brings commuters from a distance to the closest of the 3 metro stations it serves. It runs from SEEPZ and via the B cross road arrives at Chakala (J.B.Nagar) metro station runs parallel to the metro line alongside Andheri Kurla Road touching Airport Road metro station and Marol Naka metro station then via Marol Maroshi Road back to SEEPZ.

History

Station layout

Facilities

List of available ATM at Airport Road metro station. Domino's, Jumboking outlets are available

See also
Public transport in Mumbai
List of Mumbai Metro stations
List of rapid transit systems in India
List of Metro Systems
Chhatrapati Shivaji International Airport

References

External links

The official site of Mumbai Metro
 UrbanRail.Net – descriptions of all metro systems in the world, each with a schematic map showing all stations.

Mumbai Metro stations
Railway stations in India opened in 2014
2014 establishments in Maharashtra
Airport railway stations in India